Chcete být milionářem? (English translation: Do you want to be a millionaire?) is a Czech game show based on the original British format of Who Wants to Be a Millionaire?. The show was hosted by Vladimír Čech, Ondřej Hejma, and Marek Vašut (consecutively). The main goal of the game is to win 10 million Kč by answering 15 multiple-choice questions correctly. There were 3 lifelines, in the new version a 4th lifeline was added - fifty fifty (50:50), phone a friend (přítel na telefonu), ask the audience (rada publika) and help of the one from audience (pomoc diváka z publika). The game show was broadcast on Czech TV station TV Nova. When a contestant correctly answered the fifth question, they could leave with at least 10,000 Kč. When a contestant got the tenth question correct, they could leave with at least 320,000 Kč. Nobody won the main prize. The format was briefly adopted by another TV station under the name Milionář. The show was on from 2000 to 2005, before returning in March 2016 with new Risk format, which eliminates the second safety net after the tenth question. The 2016 episodes were recorded in Cologne, where German and Austrian versions were shot as well. In June 2017 the show returned to air.

Money tree

External links 
 Official website of Chcete být milionářem? at Web Archive

Who Wants to Be a Millionaire?
Czech game shows
TV Nova (Czech TV channel) original programming
2000 Czech television series debuts
2005 Czech television series endings
2000s Czech television series
2000s game shows